Comitas williamsi is an extinct species of sea snail, a marine gastropod mollusc in the family Pseudomelatomidae, the turrids and allies.

Description

Distribution
This marine species is endemic to New Zealand. Fossils have been found in Upper Cenozoic strata of the Wairoa District

References

 Marwick, John. Upper Cenozoic Mollusca of Wairoa District, Hawkeś Bay. New Zealand Department of Scientific and Industrial Research, New Zealand Geological Survey, 1965.
 Maxwell, P.A. (2009). Cenozoic Mollusca. pp 232–254 in Gordon, D.P. (ed.) New Zealand inventory of biodiversity. Volume one. Kingdom Animalia: Radiata, Lophotrochozoa, Deuterostomia. Canterbury University Press, Christchurch.

External links
 

williamsi
Gastropods described in 1965
Gastropods of New Zealand